Sadaharu Oh (Japanese: , Ō Sadaharu; born May 20, 1940), also known as Wang Chen-chih, is a Japanese-born former baseball player and manager who is currently the chairman of the Fukuoka SoftBank Hawks of Nippon Professional Baseball. Oh holds the world lifetime home run record, having hit 868 home runs during his professional career. He established many NPB batting records, including runs batted in (RBI) (2,170), slugging percentage (.634), bases on balls (2,390), and on-base plus slugging percentage (OPS) (1.080). In 1977, Oh became the first recipient of the People's Honour Award. He was inducted into the Japanese Baseball Hall of Fame in 1994.

Oh batted and threw left-handed and primarily played first base. Originally signed with the powerhouse Yomiuri Giants in 1959 as a pitcher, Oh was soon converted to a full-time hitter. Under the tutelage of coach Hiroshi Arakawa, Oh developed his distinctive "flamingo" leg kick. It took Oh three years to blossom, but he went on to dominate the baseball league in Japan. He was a 15-time home run champion and was named to the All-Star team 18 times. More than just a power hitter, Oh was a five-time batting champion and won the Japanese Central League's batting triple crown twice. With Oh at first base, the Yomiuri Giants won 11 Japan Series championships. Oh was named the Central League's Most Valuable Player nine times. In addition to the world career home run record, he held Japan's single-season home run record with 55, until Wladimir Balentien broke the record in 2013.

Oh played his entire professional career with the Giants and was their manager from 1984 to 1988. He also managed the Fukuoka Daiei/Fukuoka SoftBank Hawks from 1995 to 2008. He was the manager of the Japanese national team in the inaugural World Baseball Classic. The Japanese team defeated the Cuba national team for the championship. He is currently the chairman of the Hawks.

Early life 
Oh was born in Sumida, Tokyo, as the fourth of six children of a Japanese mother Tomi Oh  (née Tozumi ) and a Chinese father  (王仕福 Wáng Shìfú) from Qingtian County, Zhejiang. Oh was the youngest of four children during most of his childhood, as his twin sister died when they were 15 months old, and his younger sister died shortly after she was born. Although born in Japan, Oh is a citizen of the Republic of China (ROC), as his father had left for Japan when the ROC still governed Mainland China and chose to retain his ROC citizenship.

Playing career

Prep career
Oh managed to make his high school team, and, in 1957,  made it to the Spring Koshien Tournament with the second-year Oh as its ace pitcher. Before the tournament started, Oh suffered serious blisters on two fingers of his pitching hand. Oh pitched the entire first game at Koshien and his team won. The next day, Oh pitched another complete game and earned the victory, but the blisters worsened. Oh faced the prospect of pitching two more games on consecutive days for the championship with injuries. Oh pitched and won another complete game, enduring the pain.

Oh was able to just make it through his fourth complete game in four days, squeaking out a one-run victory. Oh won the championship, though was not allowed to play in the Kokutai due to being Chinese.

Professional career
In 1959, he signed his first professional contract as a pitcher for the Yomiuri Giants. However, Oh was not a strong enough pitcher to succeed professionally, and soon switched to first base, working diligently with coach Hiroshi Arakawa to improve his hitting skills. This led to the development of Oh's distinctive "flamingo" leg kick. His batting average jumped from .161 in his rookie season to .270 in 1960, and his home runs more than doubled. His performance dipped slightly in both statistical categories in 1961, but Oh truly blossomed in 1962, when he hit 38 home runs.

In 1964, Oh hit 55 home runs, a single-season record he owned for 37 years until it was tied by Tuffy Rhodes in 2001. Oh surpassed 50 home runs in a season two other times, in 1973 and 1977.

Oh became friends with Hank Aaron, his contemporary in Major League Baseball. The two squared off in a home run derby before an exhibition game at Korakuen Stadium on 2 November 1974, after Aaron eclipsed Babe Ruth's home run record. By that time, Oh was running away with the Japanese home run record, having become the first Japanese baseball player to hit 600 career home runs that year. Aaron won, 10-9.

His hitting exploits benefited from the fact that for most of his career he batted third in the Giants' lineup, with another very dangerous hitter, Shigeo Nagashima, batting fourth; the two players forming the feared "O-N Cannon". In his autobiography, Sadaharu Oh: A Zen Way of Baseball, Oh said he and Nagashima were not close, rarely spending time together off the field.

Sadaharu Oh retired in 1980 at age 40, having amassed 2,786 hits (third after Isao Harimoto (Jang Hoon) and Katsuya Nomura), 2,170 RBIs, a lifetime batting average of .301, and 868 home runs.

Managing career
Sadaharu Oh was the assistant manager of the Yomiuri Giants between 1981 and 1983. He became the manager of the Yomiuri Giants between 1984 and 1988. He led the Giants to one Central League pennant in 1987. He was asked to retire as Giants manager after the 1988 season.

In 1995, he returned to baseball as the manager of the Fukuoka Daiei Hawks (later the Fukuoka SoftBank Hawks). Oh led the Hawks to three Pacific League pennants in 1999, 2000 and 2003, and two Japan Series titles in 1999 and 2003.

In 2006, Oh managed the Japan national baseball team, winning the championship in the inaugural 2006 World Baseball Classic over Cuba.

On July 5, Oh announced that he was taking an indefinite leave of absence from the Hawks to combat a stomach tumor. On July 17, 2006, Oh underwent laparoscopic surgery to remove his stomach and its surrounding lymph nodes. The surgery was considered to be a success. Although the tumor was confirmed to be cancerous, it was caught in early stages. He returned to coaching the Fukuoka SoftBank Hawks, although he announced he would retire at the end of the 2008 season as manager (but remain as Hawks' GM). He retired as a manager in 2008.

Home run record controversy
On three occasions, foreign-born players challenged Oh's single-season home run record of 55 and faced Oh-managed teams late in the season. On each occasion, Oh's pitchers refused to throw strikes to them.

In 1985, American Randy Bass, playing for the Hanshin Tigers, came into the last game of the season against the Oh-managed Giants with 54 home runs. Bass was intentionally walked four times on four straight pitches each time. Bass reached over the plate on the fifth occasion and batted the ball into the outfield for a single. After the game, Oh denied ordering his pitchers to walk Bass, but Keith Comstock, an American pitcher for the Giants, later stated that an unnamed Giants coach had threatened a fine of $1,000 for every strike that any Giants pitcher threw to Bass. The magazine Takarajima investigated the incident and reported that the Giants front office had likely ordered the team not to allow Bass an opportunity to tie or break Oh's record. For the most part, the Japanese media remained silent on the incident, as did league commissioner Takeso Shimoda.

In 2001, American Karl "Tuffy" Rhodes, playing for the Osaka Kintetsu Buffaloes, hit 55 home runs with several games left. The Buffaloes played the Oh-managed Fukuoka Daiei Hawks on a late weekend series in Fukuoka. Rhodes was intentionally walked during each at-bat. Hawks catcher Kenji Johjima could be seen grinning as he caught the intentional balls. Again, Oh denied any involvement and Hawks pitching coach Yoshiharu Wakana stated that the pitchers acted on his orders, saying, "I just didn't want a foreign player to break Oh's record." Rhodes completed the season with 55 home runs. Hawks pitcher Keisaburo Tanoue went on record saying that he wanted to throw strikes to Rhodes and felt bad about the situation.

In 2002, Venezuelan Alex Cabrera hit 55 home runs with five games left in the season and his team played Oh's Hawks. Oh told his pitchers to throw strikes to Cabrera, but most of them ignored his order and threw balls well away from the plate. After the game, Oh stated, "If you're going to break the record, you should do it by more than one. Do it by a lot." In the wake of the most recent incident involving Cabrera, ESPN listed Oh's single-season home run record on its list of "The Phoniest Records in Sports".

Wladimir Balentien, a Curaçaoan born player, broke Oh's home run record on September 15, 2013, by hitting his 56th and 57th home runs of the season in a game against the Hanshin Tigers. Balentien ended that season with 60 home runs.

Personal life
She died of stomach cancer, the same disease he had in 2006, in December 2001 at age 57. Their second daughter, Rie (born in 1970), is a sportscaster and presenter on the J-Wave radio network.

In popular culture 
 Oh is mentioned in the Beastie Boys song "Hey Ladies": "I got more hits than Sadaharu Oh."
 Oh is Mentioned in A Different World season 2 episode 20, "No means No".
 A character in the manga series Kinnikuman is named after Sadaharu Oh.
 Oh is mentioned in the manga series Hajime no Ippo.
 Oh is mentioned in the 1979 movie The Bad News Bears Go to Japan.

Miscellaneous
 In 1988, Oh and Hank Aaron created the World Children's Baseball Fair (WCBF), to increase the popularity of baseball by working with youngsters.
On December 4, 2007, Oh said in Chiyoda, Tokyo that it is just a matter of time before his career record of 868 home runs will be broken: "I think the 868 record will be broken. There's nobody near that mark in Japan, but I think Alex Rodriguez can do it", he added. "He has the ability to hit 1,000." (Rodriguez retired seven years later, at the age of 41, with 696 home runs.)
In 2002 and 2005, he was named by President Chen Shui-bian of Taiwan as Ambassador-at-Large of the Republic of China.
President Ma Ying-Jeou honored Sadaharu Oh with the "Order of Brilliant Star" on February 5, 2009, in Taipei. Oh called receiving the award, "The highest honor of his life."
During the 2009 World Baseball Classic, Oh attended many of the games played by Japan.
During the 2020 Summer Olympic Games in Tokyo (which took place in 2021 due to the COVID-19 pandemic), he was a part of a group that carried the torch in the stadium.

Statistics

References

External links

 
 Oh for Cooperstown? Part I by Jim Albright
 Oh for Cooperstown? Part II by Jim Albright

1940 births
Living people
Fukuoka SoftBank Hawks managers
Nippon Professional Baseball first basemen
Nippon Professional Baseball MVP Award winners
People's Honour Award winners
Japanese Baseball Hall of Fame inductees
Sportspeople from Tokyo
World Baseball Classic managers
Yomiuri Giants managers
Yomiuri Giants players
Japanese people of Chinese descent